William Vincent Rawlings (August 17, 1913 – December 27, 1975) was an attorney and Democratic State Senator from Virginia, who served in the Senate of Virginia from 1961 until his death in 1975.

Early life
Rawlings was  born in Capron, Virginia, on August 17, 1913.  He graduated from Virginia Military Institute in 1933 with a bachelor's degree in Civil Engineering.  He received his law degree from the University of Virginia and practiced law in the town of Franklin, Virginia.  Rawlings married Novella Pope.

Public service
Rawlings served as an appointed member of the Southampton County School Board and chaired the board during the upheaval of public school desegregation and Virginia's policy of Massive resistance.

In 1961, Senator Mills Godwin was elected Lieutenant Governor of Virginia and Rawlings contested the special election to represent the 5th District, winning with about 60% of the vote.  Rawlings served in the Senate until his death in 1975.

Death
Rawlings died on December 27, 1975, and was buried in Capron, Virginia.

References

1913 births
1975 deaths
Democratic Party Virginia state senators
University of Virginia School of Law alumni
Virginia Military Institute alumni
Virginia lawyers
People from Southampton County, Virginia
20th-century American politicians
20th-century American lawyers